The Society of Tribologists and Lubrication Engineers (STLE) is an American non-profit technical society for the tribology and lubrication engineering sectors worldwide. Its offices are in Park Ridge, Illinois.

Established in 1944 as the American Society of Lubrication Engineers (ASLE), the STLE is now one of the world's largest associations solely dedicated to the advancement of the field of tribology. The STLE currently has over 13,000 members. 

An official STLE journal, Tribology Transactions, is published by Taylor and Francis and the society is also affiliated with Tribology Letters, published by Springer. The STLE also publish a monthly magazine, Tribology and Lubrication Technology.

References

Engineering societies based in the United States
Mechanical engineering organizations
International professional associations
Non-profit organizations based in Chicago
Tribology